James Cerretani and Lukáš Rosol were the defending champions. They chose to not participate this year.
Sanchai and Sonchat Ratiwatana defeated Benedikt Dorsch and Sam Warburg 6–4, 3–6, [10–8] in the final.

Seeds

Draw

Draw

External links
 Doubles Draw

KGHM Dialog Polish Indoors - Doubles